Jim Simmerman (March 5, 1952 – June 29, 2006) was a poet and editor from the United States.

Biography
Simmerman was born in Boulder, Colorado, in 1952. He received his MFA in Poetry from University of Iowa in 1980.  He was Regents Professor of English at Northern Arizona University in Flagstaff, Arizona, where he led poetry writing workshops and served as an advisor to the literary journal Thin Air. He took his own life on June 29, 2006 in Flagstaff, Arizona after a long illness.

His poems have appeared widely in journals (Antæus, Georgia Review, North American Review, Ploughshares, Poetry), anthologies (The Bread Loaf Anthology of Contemporary American Poetry, The POETRY Anthology 1912-2002, Pushcart Prize X: Best of the Small Presses), and textbooks (Literature: Reading, Reacting, Writing; Thirteen Ways of Looking for a Poem: A Guide to Writing Poetry; Western Wind: An Introduction to Poetry); and his poetry writing exercise "Twenty Little Poetry Projects" generated the anthology Mischief, Caprice, & Other Poetic Strategies (Red Hen Press, 2004), edited by Terry Wolverton.

He is also co-editor, with Joseph Duemer, of Dog Music: Poetry about Dogs (St. Martin's Press, 1996).

Awards
Jim Simmerman was the recipient of fellowships from the Arizona Commission on the Arts, the Bread Loaf Writers' Conference, the Port Townsend Writers' Conference, the Fine Arts Work Center, the Hawthornden Castle International Retreat for Writers, and the NEA.

Works
 Home (Dragon Gate, Inc., 1983), chosen by Raymond Carver as a Pushcart Prize "Writer's Choice" Selection
 Once Out of Nature (The Galileo Press, Ltd., 1989), a "Best of the Small Presses" feature at the Frankfurt Book Fair
 Moon Go Away, I Don't Love You No More (Miami U. Press, 1994)
 Kingdom Come (Miami U. Press, 1999)
  American Children (BOA Editions, 2005).

References

External links
 The Academy of American Poets

American male poets
University of Iowa alumni
Northern Arizona University faculty
People from Flagstaff, Arizona
1952 births
2006 deaths
Iowa Writers' Workshop alumni
20th-century American poets
20th-century American male writers